Jackson Township is one of twelve townships in Huntington County, Indiana, United States. As of the 2010 census, its population was 4,043 and it contained 1,704 housing units.

History
Jackson Township was organized in 1841.

Geography

Cities and towns
 Roanoke

Unincorporated towns
 Mahon
 Roanoke Station

Adjacent townships
 Jefferson Township, Whitley County (north)
 Aboite Township, Allen County (northeast)
 Lafayette Township, Allen County (east)
 Union Township, Wells County (southeast)
 Union Township (south)
 Huntington Township (southwest)
 Clear Creek Township (west)
 Washington Township, Whitley County (northwest)

Cemeteries
The township contains two cemeteries: France and Union.

Major highways
  U.S. Route 24
  Indiana State Road 114

Airports and landing strips
 Fisher Farm Airport
 The Wolf Den Airport

References
 
 United States Census Bureau cartographic boundary files

External links
 Indiana Township Association
 United Township Association of Indiana

Townships in Huntington County, Indiana
Townships in Indiana